For Traya see:
Darth Traya
Misti Traya